Assiniboine 76 is an Indian reserve of the Carry the Kettle Nakoda First Nation in Saskatchewan. It is 80 kilometers east of Regina. In the 2016 Canadian Census, it recorded a population of 443 living in 182 of its 214 total private dwellings. In the same year, its Community Well-Being index was calculated at 54 of 100, compared to 58.4 for the average First Nations community and 77.5 for the average non-Indigenous community.

References

Indian reserves in Saskatchewan
Division No. 6, Saskatchewan
Carry the Kettle Nakoda Nation